Theater Phönix is a theatre in Linz, Upper Austria, founded in 1989.

References

Theatres in Linz
Buildings and structures in Linz
Tourist attractions in Linz